In mathematics, Yau's conjecture on the first eigenvalue is, as of 2018, an unsolved conjecture proposed by Shing-Tung Yau in 1982. It asks:

If true, it will imply that the area of embedded minimal hypersurfaces in  will have an upper bound depending only on the genus.

Some possible reformulations are as follows:

 The first eigenvalue of every closed embedded minimal hypersurface  in the unit sphere (1) is 

 The first eigenvalue of an embedded compact minimal hypersurface  of the standard (n + 1)-sphere with sectional curvature 1 is 

 If  is the unit (n + 1)-sphere with its standard round metric, then the first Laplacian eigenvalue on a closed embedded minimal hypersurface  is 

The Yau's conjecture is verified for several special cases, but still open in general.

Shiing-Shen Chern conjectured that a closed, minimally immersed hypersurface in (1), whose second fundamental form has constant length, is isoparametric. If true, it would have established the Yau's conjecture for the minimal hypersurface whose second fundamental form has constant length.

A possible generalization of the Yau's conjecture:

Let  be a closed minimal submanifold in the unit sphere (1) with dimension  of  satisfying .

Further reading
  (Problem 100)
 
 

Differential geometry
Conjectures
Unsolved problems in mathematics